Wild Fruit (French: Les fruits sauvages) is a 1954 French drama film directed by Hervé Bromberger and starring Estella Blain, Évelyne Ker and Nadine Basile. It was shot at the Saint-Maurice Studios in Paris and distributed by Cinédis.

Synopsis
Maria kills her father in order to stop him forcing her younger sister Christine into prostitution. The family flee to small village in Provence but are eventually tracked down by the police.

Cast
 Estella Blain as Maria Manzana 
  as Christine Manzana 
  as Anna
 Nadine Basile as Françoise
 Jean-Pierre Bonnefous as 	José Manzana 
 Roger Dumas as 	Hans
 Jacques Moulières as Frédéric
 Michel Reynald as Michel Manzana
 Talina Sauser as 	Lolita
 Norbert Pierlot as Le berger
 Marco Villa as Forgeau
 Albert Rémy as Louis 
 Georges Chamarat as 	Manzana

Awards
1954 Locarno International Film Festival
Won: Golden Leopard

References

External links

1954 films
French black-and-white films
Films directed by Hervé Bromberger
Golden Leopard winners
French drama films
1954 drama films
1950s French-language films
Films based on French novels
Films shot at Saint-Maurice Studios
1950s French films